Max Ehinger (22 May 1908 – 17 July 1974) was a Swiss writer. His work was part of the literature event in the art competition at the 1948 Summer Olympics.

References

1908 births
1974 deaths
20th-century Swiss writers
Olympic competitors in art competitions
Writers from Basel-Stadt